Abbas Hassan Chahrour (born 1 January 1972) is a Lebanese former footballer who played as a defender.

He played for Lebanese Premier League side Nejmeh from 1994 to 2003, and represented Lebanon from 1996 to 2001, participating at the 1998 Asian Games, 2000 AFC Asian Cup, and multiple World Cup qualifiers campaigns.

International career
Chahrour represented Lebanon in the 2000 AFC Asian Cup, held in Lebanon. On 15 October 2000, he scored a volley from 23 meters, in a 2–2 draw against Iraq in the AFC Asian Cup; it was Lebanon's first goal in the competition. In 2020 his goal against Iraq was nominated for the AFC Asian Cup Greatest Goals Bracket Challenge, an online poll voted by fans. Chahrour's goal reached the final, finishing second out of 32 goals.

Career statistics

International
Scores and results list Lebanon's goal tally first, score column indicates score after each Chahrour goal.

References

External links
 

1972 births
Living people
People from Matn District
Association football defenders
Lebanese footballers
Lebanon international footballers
Asian Games competitors for Lebanon
Footballers at the 1998 Asian Games
2000 AFC Asian Cup players
Lebanese Premier League players
Nejmeh SC players